Frumușica is a commune in Botoșani County, Western Moldavia, Romania. It is composed of six villages: Boscoteni, Frumușica, Rădeni, Storești, Șendreni and Vlădeni-Deal.

On July 5, 2010, the Danube in Galați recorded a flow rate of 676 cm (76 cm above the rate of flooding) and a flow of 16,055 m/s. At Șendreni, the Siret had a rate of 728 cm (78 cm over the danger level). The local emergency services reinforced the dykes in the afternoon and narrowly averted any additional flooding. It was flooded during the July 2010 flood as was its namesake in Galați County.

Natives
Zigu Ornea

See also
Global storm activity of 2010
2010 Romanian floods

Notes

Communes in Botoșani County
Localities in Western Moldavia